Hill of Freedom is a 2014 South Korean arthouse film written and directed by Hong Sang-soo. It premiered in the Orizzonti ("Horizons") section of the 71st Venice International Film Festival, and won Best Film at the 34th Korean Association of Film Critics Awards and the 36th Three Continents Festival. Hill of Freedom also made The New Yorker'''s list of Best Undistributed Films of 2014.

Plot
Japanese language teacher Mori arrives in Seoul to track down Kwon, a South Korean woman he fell for several years ago. Mori arrives in Bukchon, a neighborhood in the center of the city which has a tranquil atmosphere and historical background. Hoping for a chance to see her, he stays at a guesthouse near Kwon's old home, and he's befriended by the elderly owner, Gu-ok, and her broke but sociable nephew Sang-won. Mori begins to frequent Jiyugaoka'' ("Hill of Freedom"), a local coffee shop owned by Young-sun, where he writes letters to Kwon. Then even though Young-sun already has a boyfriend, she and Mori become lovers.

Cast
Ryo Kase as Mori
Moon So-ri as Young-sun
Seo Young-hwa as Kwon
Kim Eui-sung as Sang-won
Youn Yuh-jung as Gu-ok
Gi Ju-bong as Byeong-joo
Lee Min-woo as Ji Kwang-hyun
Jung Eun-chae as Nam-hee
Jeong Yong-jin as Yeom-gu
Na Hye-jin as Employee
Kim Min-jae as Employee

Awards and nominations

References

External links

Films directed by Hong Sang-soo
2014 films
South Korean drama films
2010s South Korean films